Stygobromus parvus, commonly called the minute cave amphipod, is a troglomorphic species of amphipod in family Crangonyctidae. It is endemic to West Virginia in the United States.

References

Freshwater crustaceans of North America
Cave crustaceans
Crustaceans described in 1969
parvus
Endemic fauna of West Virginia